Jun (stylized as JUN; born in Kobe, Hyōgo) is a Japanese visual kei rock musician and singer-songwriter who is currently the guitarist of GOTCHAROCKA. Previously he was in the bands Se'lavy, Mar'derayla and Phantasmagoria, Spiv States (stylized as SPIV STATES and previously as spiv states) and released solo material under the alias Attic (stylized as attic) and under his own name.

Band history

Se'lavy and Mar'derayla 
Jun's first known band was Se'lavy. Not much is known about them except that Iori was also in the group. His second band Mar'derayla formed in 2002 and were signed to Under Code Production, a sublabel of Free-Will run by Jun's future bandmate Kisaki. The group also contained Iori on guitar, Hayato on vocals, Hagane on bass and Rui on drums. Their debut mini-album Kiseki... Ring was released in May 2003, Rui left soon after and was replaced by Toki in June. They announced they would be disbanding after the release of "Love & Peace & Horror" on March 10, 2004, but officially disbanded on August 1.

Phantasmagoria

Solo 
When Phantasmagoria disbanded in 2007, Jun quickly started releasing solo material under the name Attic. The first release being Atomic Smile on March 7 on Under Code Productions. This was followed with Mechanical Ugly Gang on December 17. He then released the single "Look for "Mr. Name"" on August 6, 2008, under his own name on the label Daiki Sound. It came in two editions, each containing a different A-side.

Spiv States 
Spiv States was formed as a duo in November 2009 with Jun on vocals and guitar and his longtime friend Iori also on guitar. They had their first show on November 18 and released their debut single "Viva Sonic" in December. Spiv States became the first band signed to the record label Cloud in April 2010 and released the single "Flavor" on August 25, which featured former Plastic Tree drummer Hiroshi Sasabuchi. Their next single "Glider" also featured Hiroshi. September 22, 2010 was the last show with Iori, as he left the group due to bad health caused by a herniated disc in his back. Guitarist Ryo, bassist Zechs and drummer Seiya joined Spiv States in December. However, they all decided to leave the group and had their last concert on July 13, 2011. That same day was the release of the mini-album Futari no Hoshi, which featured former Die in Cries guitarist Takashi and Sads drummer Go. It included the song "Always", which was written after the 2011 Tōhoku earthquake and tsunami. Jun continued Spiv States as the only official member with revolving support musicians. 
In 2012, Jun announced that Spiv States will be taking a break from all activities and leave the Maverick DC Label.

GOTCHAROCKA 
In May 2012, Jun started a new band with vocalist Jui (ex-Vidoll). They were joined by guitarist Toya (ex-Charlotte) and bassist Shingo (ex-Sugar, Moran support).

Spiv States members 
 Jun – vocals, guitar, songwriter

Former members 
 Seiya – support bass
 Mikami – support drums
 Iori – guitar (2009–2010)
 Ryo – guitar (2010–2011)
  – bass (2010–2011)
  – drums (2010–2011)

Discography 
With Spiv States
 "Viva Sonic" (December 2009)
 "Microbe" (January 2010)
 "Mutant" (February 2010)
 Novelty Hunter (May 19, 2010)
 
 
 

With Mar'derayla
 
 
 "Love & Peace & Horror" (March 10, 2004)
 
 "Romantist Carnival" (July 21, 2004, split single with Karen)

With Phantasmagoria
Phantasmagoria discography

As Attic
 Atomic Smile (March 7, 2007)
 Mechanical Ugly Gang (December 19, 2007) Oricon Ranking: #86 (Type B)

As Jun
 "Look for "Mr. Name"" (August 6, 2008)

With GOTCHAROCKA
 Gotcha6ka (July 1, 2012)
 Hydrag (August 29, 2012)
 Virginity (December 19, 2012)
 Poisonous Berry (March 6, 2013)
 Crisis (July 17, 2013)
 Short Cake (December 4, 2013)
 Gekiai (June 4, 2014)
 Alarm (July 2, 2014)
 8kaika (September 23, 2014)
 GPS (January 13, 2015)
 Emotion/Director's Cut (April 8, 2015)
 Royale (June 17, 2015)

References

External links 
 Spiv States Official website
 Cloud Official YouTube

1983 births
Living people
Visual kei musicians
Japanese male rock singers
Japanese male singer-songwriters
Japanese singer-songwriters
Japanese rock guitarists
Musicians from Kobe
21st-century Japanese singers
21st-century Japanese male singers
21st-century Japanese guitarists